This is a list of years in Georgia. See also the timeline of Georgian history.

21st century

 
Georgia (country) history-related lists
Georgia